Lutosławski (feminine: Lutosławska; plural: Lutosławscy) is a Polish surname. Notable people include:

 Kazimierz Lutosławski (1880–1924), Polish physician, priest and Polish Scouting founder and activist, brother of Marian and father of Witold
 Marian Lutosławski (1871–1918), Polish mechanical engineer and inventor, brother of Kazimierz and uncle of Witold
 Wincenty Lutosławski (1863–1954), Polish philosopher and author
 Witold Lutosławski (1913–1994), Polish composer and conductor, son of Kazimierz and nephew of Marian

See also
 

Polish-language surnames